Delwood Frederick Huyghebaert, O.M.M., C.D. (Lt Colonel-Ret) (May 27, 1944 – August 2, 2018) was a Canadian politician, who served as a member of the Legislative Assembly of Saskatchewan from 2000 to 2016, representing the riding of Wood River as a member of the Saskatchewan Party.

Prior to his election to public office, he was a Fighter pilot in the Canadian Forces. His most notable duty was as commander of the Snowbirds Air Demonstration Team – 431 Squadron.

In 1986, he was made an Officer of the Order of Military Merit.

In 1997, he ran for the leadership of the fledgling Saskatchewan Party.  He finished 3rd among three candidates.  In 1995, he ran for the Progressive Conservative Party. In 1999, he narrowly lost election in the Wood River constituency as the Saskatchewan Party candidate.  On election night, he tied Liberal candidate Glen McPherson.  The returning officer cast the deciding vote in favour of McPherson.  This result was later thrown out in court and a by-election was ordered.  McPherson did not run and Huyghebaert then won a resounding victory.  He was re-elected in 2003, 2007, and 2011.

On May 29, 2009, Huyghebaert was appointed to cabinet by Saskatchewan Premier Brad Wall in the role of minister of Corrections, Public Safety and Policing.

Huyghebaert retired from politics after the 2016 election. He died on August 2, 2018.

Electoral record

References

External links
Biography of Yogi Huyghebaert from Saskatchewan Party

1944 births
2018 deaths
Canadian Air Force personnel
Canadian people of Flemish descent
Members of the Executive Council of Saskatchewan
Saskatchewan Party MLAs
21st-century Canadian politicians
People from Lafleche, Saskatchewan